Wycombe Museum (aka Wycombe Local History and Chair Museum) is a free local museum located in the town of High Wycombe, Buckinghamshire, England. It is run by Wycombe Heritage and Arts Trust, as of 1 December 2016. It was previously run by Wycombe District Council.

The museum is located in Castle Hill House on Priory Avenue. It is situated in an 18th-century house on a medieval site, and surrounding the museum are Victorian gardens. The museum presents exhibitions the history of the local area, including the furniture industry, especially chair-making. There are also displays of Windsor chairs, lace, art and natural history.

Collections
The museum collections include:

 Social history of the Wycombe and Buckinghamshire areas.
 Furniture industry — chairs, other furniture and tools that relate to the furniture industry in and around High Wycombe, videotapes of craftsmen at work.
 Tokens and coins — including trade tokens relating to the Wycombe and Buckinghamshire areas.
 Art — oil paintings, prints, watercolours, drawings, engravings, brass rubbings and sculpture.
 Oral history tapes — recordings taken over the past 30 years.
 Archive material and photographs — sale catalogues, price lists, design books and account books of furniture companies dating back to the 19th century.
 Photographs — relating to the town and the furniture industry and trade in the Wycombe area.
 Wycombe Wanderers - showcasing memorabilia from the club, inducing the Wycombe Comanche

Trivia
The museum was mentioned in Gavin & Stacey, written by James Corden who was raised in the area.

References

External links
 Wycombe Museum website
 Wycombe Museum page, Facebook

Museums with year of establishment missing
Local museums in Buckinghamshire
Decorative arts museums in England
High Wycombe
Chair-making
Furniture museums